NGC 2541 is an unbarred spiral galaxy located about 40 million light-years away. It is in the NGC 2841 group of galaxies with NGC 2500, NGC 2537, and NGC 2552.

References

External links
 
 Galaxy Catalogue, Princeton University 
 

Unbarred spiral galaxies
NGC 2841 group
Lynx (constellation)
2541
04284
23110